The Martin Luther King Jr. Memorial Bridge carries U.S. Route 1 and U.S. Route 301 (Jefferson Davis Highway) across the Appomattox River at the Atlantic Seaboard fall line. It joins Colonial Heights and Petersburg, Virginia.

Originally constructed for an interurban streetcar service in the early 20th century, it was rebuilt in the 1990s and is toll-free.

See also
List of bridges documented by the Historic American Engineering Record in Virginia
List of memorials to Martin Luther King Jr.

References

External links

Bridges of the United States Numbered Highway System
Historic American Engineering Record in Virginia
Road bridges in Virginia
Railroad bridges in Virginia
Transportation in Petersburg, Virginia
U.S. Route 1
U.S. Route 301